John Butler, 2nd Marquess of Ormonde, KP (24 August 1808 – 25 September 1854) was an Irish politician and peer.

Family
He was the son of James Butler, 1st Marquess of Ormonde and Grace Louisa Staples. He married Frances Jane Paget, daughter of General Hon. Sir Edward Paget, GCB and Lady Harriet Legge, on 19 September 1843.

He held the office of a Lord-in-waiting between 1841 and 1852 and between 1853 and 1854 He was invested as a Knight, Order of St Patrick (K.P.) in 1845. He was elected as Member of Parliament (MP) for County Kilkenny in 1830, and held the seat until 1832.

He was the author of An Autumn in Sicily, Dublin: Hodges and Smith, 1850.

Possible elevation to Dukedom

Lord Ormonde's son, James Butler, 3rd Marquess of Ormonde is recorded as having written to the then Prime Minister of the United Kingdom, Benjamin Disraeli, regarding the restoration of the Dukedom of Ormonde in October 1868. The third Marquess claimed that his grandfather, James Butler, 1st Marquess of Ormonde (then 19th Earl of Ormond) had been advised by Lord Liverpool to apply for the restoration of the Dukedom, and that Lord Liverpool had advised him that in order to achieve this, he would first need to apply to be elevated from the rank of Earl to Marquess. An application was duly made, and James, 19th Earl of Ormond was granted the title Marquess of Ormonde. The 3rd Marquess believed that Lord Liverpool's loss of the Office of Prime Minister in 1827 frustrated this plan, and the 1st Marquess took no further action towards applying for the restoration of the Dukedom. The 3rd Marquess also alleged in his letter to Prime Minister Disraeli that his father, the second Marquess, had resolved not to pursue the restoration of the Dukedom of Ormonde unless another peer was also elevated to a Dukedom during his lifetime.

Marriage and children
The Marquess and Marchioness had four sons and two daughters:
 James Butler, 3rd Marquess of Ormonde (1844–1919), married Lady Elizabeth Harriet Grosvenor, daughter of Hugh Lupus Grosvenor, 1st Duke of Westminster, and had issue.
 Lady Mary Grace Louisa Butler (1846–1929), married the Hon. William Henry Fitzwilliam and had issue.
 Lord James Herbert Thomas Butler (1847–1867).
 James Arthur Wellington Foley Butler, 4th Marquess of Ormonde (1849–1943), married Ellen Sprague and had issue.
 Lord Theobald Butler (1852–1929), married Annabella Brydon and had issue, including James Butler, 7th Marquess of Ormonde.
 Lady Blanche Henrietta Maria Butler (1854–1914), married Colonel the Hon. Cuthbert Ellison Edwardes, son of the 3rd Baron Kensington, and had issue.

He was succeeded by his eldest son. His grave can be found in St Canice's Cathedral in Kilkenny.

Works

References

External links 
 

1808 births
1854 deaths
Knights of St Patrick
John
Members of the Parliament of the United Kingdom for County Kilkenny constituencies (1801–1922)
UK MPs 1830–1831
UK MPs 1831–1832
UK MPs who inherited peerages
John